William Gaunt (1900–1980) was a British artist and art historian, best known for his books on British 19th-century art.

Born the son of a graphic designer and chromolithographer, Gaunt dabbled in drawing and writing as a youth. In 1914, after winning a literary contest in The Connoisseur for an essay on Shakespeare's The Tempest, his thoughts seriously turned to becoming a critic. He served briefly in World War I, fighting in the Durham Light Infantry in 1918, until the war ended that year. The following year he attended Worcester College, Oxford, where he read modern history and participated in the Art Society. At Oxford, his friends included John Rothenstein and Cyril Connolly. Graduating with honours in 1922, he studied at the Ruskin School of Drawing and wrote reviews of art exhibitions.  

He worked as a free-lance contributor for The Studio magazine, editing several special issues. Gaunt was fascinated by the Pre-Raphaelites, at that time undervalued as Victorian. He published in 1942 his most enduring title on that subject, The Pre-Raphaelite Tragedy. He completed an M.A. in 1926. In 1930 he published a collection of his drawings, called London Promenade. 1935 he married Mary Catherine Reilly Connolly (died, 1980). The years 1930-39 were spent writing literary and artistic criticism, including The Pre-Raphaelite Tragedy. During the Second World-War, he took a special appointment for the war effort and researched for the book The Aesthetic Adventure.  The Gaunts lived in a country cottage near the Surrey Hampshire borders.

Selected publications
The Aesthetic Adventure
The Pre-Raphaelite Tragedy
The Pre-Raphaelite Dream
The March of the Moderns
Impressionists
Victorian Olympus
English Painting: A Concise History
Turner: Colour Library
Court Painting in England from Tudor to Victorian Times
A Concise History of English painting, 'The World of Art Library' series. Thames & Hudson, London, 1964. 
Golden Age of Flemish Art
Renoir: Colour Library
Arrows of Desire: A Study of William Blake and His Romantic World
Everyman's Dictionary of Pictorial Art. Vol.1
The Great Century of British Painting : Hogarth to Turner
Painters of Fantasy : from Hieronymus Bosch to Salvador Dalí
The Observer's Book of Painting and Graphic art
William De Morgan: Pre-Raphaelite Ceramics
Restless Century: Painting in Britain, 1800-1900
Turner
The World of William Hogarth
The Observer's Book of Modern Art: From Impressionism to the Present Day
The Observer's Book of Sculpture

References

Further reading
 Kunitz, Stanley J.  Twentieth Century Authors. First supplement.  New York:  H. W. Wilson, 1955, pp. 355–6; "Mr. William Gaunt" [obituary], Times [London]. 26 May 1980, p. 10.
 "Mr William Gaunt" [obituary] The Times, [London]. May 26, 1980, p. 10.

1900 births
1980 deaths
English art historians
20th-century British artists
20th-century English historians